The Goodwin Limestone is a geologic formation of the Pogonip Group in Nevada.

It preserves fossils dating back to the Ordovician period.

See also

 List of fossiliferous stratigraphic units in California
 List of fossiliferous stratigraphic units in Nevada

References
 

Ordovician geology of Nevada
Ordovician California
Ordovician System of North America
Geologic formations of California
Geologic formations of Nevada
Ordovician southern paleotropical deposits